Jens David Ohlin is an American academic administrator and legal scholar. He became the Allan R. Tessler Dean of Cornell Law School on July 1, 2021.

Biography 
Ohlin graduated from Phillips Academy. He then received his B.A. from Skidmore College and his M.A., M.Phil., Ph.D., J.D., all from Columbia University. He joined the faculty of  Cornell Law School, serving as Director of Faculty Research (2013–15), Associate Dean for Academic Affairs (2015–17), Vice Dean (2017–20), and Interim Dean (2020–2021). 

Ohlin became dean of Cornell Law School on July 1, 2021, succeeding Eduardo Peñalver. His scholarship ranges from criminal conspiracy law, criminal procedure, public international law to the laws of war. In Election Interference: International Law and the Future of Democracy (2020), Ohlin argued that the Russian interference in the 2016 United States elections was against international law because it violated the collective right of self-determination.

References 

Living people

Year of birth missing (living people)
Skidmore College alumni

Columbia Graduate School of Arts and Sciences alumni
Columbia Law School alumni
Cornell Law School faculty
American university and college faculty deans
American legal scholars
Phillips Academy alumni